The Marvel Animation television series Iron Man: Armored Adventures is based on Iron Man, the Marvel Comics character. The series began regular broadcasts on April 24, 2009. In Australia, where the series aired on ABC, some episodes were aired before the US and Canadian broadcasts.

Additionally, international broadcast begins with the opening credits, which are followed by the episodes in their entirety, whereas in the North American airings the teaser precedes the opening credits.

Series overview

Episodes

Season 1 (2009-10)

Season 2 (2011-12)

References

External links
 Iron Man: Armored Adventures page on Nicktoons
 

Iron Man Armored Adventures episodes
Iron Man: Armored Adventures
Iron Man: Armored Adventures
Iron Man: Armored Adventures